Farma 13 (The Farm 13) is the thirteenth season of the Slovak reality television series Farma. This season goes back to the regular format of the show where 21 ordinary Slovaks live on a farm like it was a century ago and complete tasks for the farm mentor to try and win €75,000. The season premiered on the streaming service Voyo on 27 August 2021 and premiered on Markíza 3 days later on 30 August 2021.

Format
Fifteen contestants are chosen from the outside world. Each week one contestant is selected the Farmer of the Week. In the first week, the contestants choose the Farmer. Since week 2, the Farmer is chosen by the contestant evicted in the previous week.

Nomination process
The Farmer of the Week nominates two people (a man and a woman) as the Butlers. The others must decide which Butler is the first to go to the Battle. That person then chooses the second person (from the same sex) for the Battle and also the type of battle (a quiz, extrusion, endurance, sleight). The Battle winner must win two duels. The Battle loser is evicted from the game.

Ages stated are at time of contest.

Nominations

The game

Notes

References

External links

The Farm (franchise)
2021 Slovak television seasons